Desmiphora nigroannulata is a species of beetle in the family Cerambycidae. It was described by Martins and Galileo in 2002. It is known from Brazil and French Guiana.

References

Desmiphora
Beetles described in 2002